Binnya Kyan (1420–1453) was the 13th king of the Hanthawaddy Pegu Kingdom in Burma from 1451 to 1453. Binnya Kyan, son of King Binnya Dhammaraza, came to power after assassinating his cousin King Binnya Waru in 1451. The king himself was murdered in 1453 by his first cousin Leik Munhtaw who seized the throne. Despite his raising of the height of the Shwedagon, the king murdered so many of his rivals that by the time he himself was murdered, his killer, first cousin Leik Munhtaw was the last living male descendant of King Razadarit.

Historiography
Various Burmese chronicles do not agree on the key dates of the king's life.

Notes

References

Bibliography
 
 
 
 
 
 
 

Hanthawaddy dynasty
1453 deaths
Year of birth unknown
15th-century Burmese monarchs